The following is a sortable list of cinema films which have music by Richard Wagner in their soundtracks (other than films of Wagner's operas themselves). Casual references (and use of the Bridal Chorus from Lohengrin) are not included.

Wagner music in films

References

Notes

Sources
Care, Ross (1978). "Ken Russell: Lisztomania", in Film Quarterly, Vol XXXI, No. 3, Spring 1978. Retrieved 17 August 2017.

Joe, Jeongwon and Sander L. Gilman (eds.) (2010). Wagner and Cinema. Indiana University Press. 
 Ross, Alex (2020). Wagnerism: Art and Politics in the Shadow of Music. New York: Farrar, Straus and Giroux. 
Sangild, Torben (2015). "Buñuel's Liebestod – Wagner's Tristan in Luis Buñuel's early films: Un Chien Andalou and L'Âge d'Or", in JMM: The Journal of Music and Meaning, vol. 13, 2014/2015, pp. 20–59. Retrieved 16 August 2017.
 Strötgen, Stephan (2008). ""I compose the Party Rally...": The Role of Music in Leni Riefenstahl's Triumph of the Will", in Music & Politics, vol. 2 issue 1. Retrieved 16 August 2017.

Classical music lists
Richard Wagner
Lists of films